Abat is a community in the former Shalë municipality, Shkodër County, northern Albania. At the 2015 local government reform it became part of the municipality Shkodër.

References

Populated places in Shkodër
Villages in Shkodër County